Ferguson Ridge is a ridge trending north-northwest to south-southeast, rising to 855 m southwest of Nodwell Peaks and surmounting to the southwest Mundraga Bay on Nordenskjöld Coast, Graham Land in Antarctica. The ridge was named in 1983 by the UK-APC after Harry G. Ferguson (1884-1960), British pioneer of tractor design from 1911 onward.

References
 Ferguson Ridge. SCAR Composite Antarctic Gazetteer.

Mountains of Graham Land
Nordenskjöld Coast